As a result of more than three centuries of Spanish dominance in the islands that are now the republic of the Philippines, an overwhelming number of places in the country have Spanish or Hispanic names.  As with Filipino surnames and many other aspects of Filipino culture, place names in the Philippines have received a great deal of Spanish influence, with many places in the former Spanish colony having been named after those in Spain and Latin America. The name Philippines itself originated from its old official name Filipinas in honor of King Philip II of Spain. Spanish language has also become one of the country's official languages from the late 16th century until 1986 when it was designated as a voluntary language and it remains so to this day.

Provinces
 Abra (Spanish for "opening." Originally the province was called El Abra de Vigan -- "The Opening of Vigan")
 Aurora (Spanish given name. The province was named in honor of Aurora Quezon, wife of Philippine president Manuel Quezon.)
 Camarines Norte and Camarines Sur (Camarines is the plural form of the Spanish word camarín which means "boat sheds". Norte pertains to the former province's geographical location being on the north, and Sur pertains to the latter province's geographical location being on the south.)
 Compostela Valley (named after its main topographic feature, the valley on which the town of Compostela is located. The town's name in turn may have come from the city of Santiago de Compostela in Spain.)
 Isabela (Spanish given name. The province was named after Isabella II, the reigning queen of Spain at the time of the province's creation in 1856.)
 La Union (Spanish for "the union," referring to the merging of towns from southern Ilocos Sur and northern Pangasinan that resulted in the creation of the province in 1854.)
 Laguna (Spanish for "lake," or "lagoon," referring to the large body of freshwater (Laguna de Bay, Spanish for "Lake of Bay") that was named after the province's first capital, the town of Bay.)
 Negros Occidental and Negros Oriental (Negros is Spanish for "blacks," referring to the dark-skinned Negritos that inhabited the island. Occidental refers to the former province's geographic location on the island's western half, and Oriental refers to the latter province's geographic location on the island's eastern half. The political division of the island was by a royal decree issued by the King of Spain and executed by the Governor General on January 1, 1890.)
 Nueva Ecija (Spanish for "new Écija", after a town in province of Sevilla, whose topography Don Fausto Cruzat y Góngora associated to.)
 Nueva Vizcaya (Spanish for "new Biscay", after the province in the Basque Country of Spain.)
 Quezon (Spanish surname. The province, formerly known as Tayabas, was renamed in 1949 in honor of Philippine president Manuel Quezon.)
 Quirino (Spanish surname. The province was named after Philippine president Elpidio Quirino.)
 Rizal (Spanish surname. The province was named after Philippine national hero José Rizal.)

Cities

 Alaminos, Pangasinan (Spanish surname. The city was named after the Spanish Governor-General of the Philippines, Juan Alaminos y Vivar.)
 Angeles, Pampanga (contraction of its original Spanish name El Pueblo de los Angeles which means "The Town of Angels.")
 Cadiz, Negros Occidental (named after the Spanish city of Cádiz.)
 Cagayan de Oro, Misamis Oriental ("Golden Cagayan")
 Calaca, Batangas ("skull")
 Dasmariñas, Cavite (Spanish surname. The city was named after the Spanish Governor-General of the Philippines, Gómez Pérez Dasmariñas.)
 El Salvador, Misamis Oriental (Spanish for "The Saviour", named after Jesus Christ.)
 Escalante, Negros Occidental (named after the Spanish municipality of Escalante in Cantabria, Spain.)
 General Santos (Spanish name. The city was named after Filipino general Paulino Santos.)
 General Trias, Cavite (Spanish name. The city was named after Filipino patriot Mariano Trías.)
 Isabela, Basilan (Spanish given name. The city was named after Isabella II, Queen of Spain.)
 La Carlota, Negros Occidental (named after the Spanish municipality of La Carlota.)
 Las Piñas (Spanish for "The Pineapples")
 Legazpi, Albay (Spanish surname, The city was named after the first Spanish Governor-General of the Philippines, Miguel López de Legazpi.)
 Lucena, Quezon (named after the Spanish municipality of Lucena.)
 Marikina (Spanish surname. The city was named after the Spanish Governor-General of the Philippines, Félix Berenguer de Marquina.)
 Muñoz, Nueva Ecija (Spanish surname. The city was named after Francisco Muñoz, Spanish politician and former gobernadorcillo of Nueva Ecija.)
 Oroquieta, Misamis Occidental (named after the barrio of Oroquieta in the district of Villaverde in Madrid, Spain.)
 Ozamiz, Misamis Occidental (Spanish surname. The city was named after José Ozámiz, a Filipino politician from Mindanao.)
 Puerto Princesa, Palawan (contraction of its original Spanish name Puerto de la Princesa which means "Port of the Princess" named after Princess Eulalia of Spain.)
 Quezon City	(Spanish surname. The city was named after Manuel Luis Quezon, the second president of the Philippines.)
 Roxas, Capiz (Spanish surname. The city was named after Manuel Acuña Roxas, the fifth president of the Philippines.)
 San Carlos, Negros Occidental ("Saint Charles Borromeo")
 San Carlos, Pangasinan ("Saint Charles Borromeo")
 San Fernando, La Union ("Saint Ferdinand", King of Spain.)
 San Fernando, Pampanga ("Saint Ferdinand", King of Spain.)
 San Jose, Nueva Ecija ("Saint Joseph")
 San Jose del Monte, Bulacan ("Saint Joseph of the Mountain")
 San Juan, Metro Manila ("Saint John the Baptist")
 San Pablo, Laguna ("Saint Paul the First Hermit")
 San Pedro, Laguna ("Saint Peter the Apostle")
 Santa Rosa, Laguna ("Saint Rose of Lima")
 Santiago, Isabela ("Saint James the Apostle")
 Tabaco, Albay (Spanish for "tobacco.")
 Toledo, Cebu (named after the Spanish city of Toledo.)
 Trece Martires, Cavite (Spanish for "thirteen martyrs.")
 Urdaneta, Pangasinan (Spanish surname. The city was named after Andrés de Urdaneta, Spanish friar, circumnavigator and explorer.)
 Valencia, Bukidnon (named after the Spanish city of Valencia.)
 Valenzuela, Metro Manila (Spanish surname. The city was named after Pío Valenzuela, a Filipino patriot.)
 Victorias, Negros Occidental (from Nuestra Señora de las Victorias, Spanish for "Our Lady of Victories".)

Municipalities

A
 Abra de Ilog, Mindoro Occidental ("river opening of Ilog")
 Agoncillo, Batangas (Spanish surname. The municipality was named after Filipino patriot Felipe Agoncillo.)
 Aguilar, Pangasinan (Spanish surname. The municipality was named after Spanish Governor-General Rafael María de Aguilar y Ponce de León.)
 Aguinaldo, Ifugao (Spanish surname. The municipality was named after Filipino president Emilio Aguinaldo.)
 Alaminos, Laguna (Spanish surname. The municipality was named after Spanish captain general Juan de Alaminos Rivera.)
 Albuera, Leyte (named after the Spanish village of La Albuera in Badajoz, Spain.)
 Alburquerque, Bohol (named after the Spanish town of Alburquerque in Badajoz, Spain.)
 Alcala, Cagayan (Spanish surname. The municipality was named after Spanish Governor-General Francisco de Paula Alcalá de la Torre.)
 Alcala, Pangasinan (named after the Spanish city of Alcalá de Henares in Spain.)
 Alcantara, Cebu (named after the Spanish town of Alcántara in Caceres, Spain.)
 Alcantara, Romblon (Spanish surname. The municipality was named after Filipino politician Ciriaco Alcantara.)
 Alcoy, Cebu (named after the Spanish town of Alcoy in Alicante, Spain.)
 Alegria, Cebu ("happiness" / named after the Spanish town of Alegría in Basque Country, Spain.)
 Alegria, Surigao del Norte ("happiness")
 Alfonso, Cavite (Spanish given name. The municipality was named after King Alfonso XII of Spain.)
 Alfonso Castañeda, Nueva Vizcaya (Spanish name. The municipality was named after a Filipino politician.)
 Alfonso Lista, Ifugao (Spanish name. The municipality was named after a Filipino politician.)
 Aliaga, Nueva Ecija (named after the Spanish town of Aliaga in Aragon, Spain.)
 Alicia, Bohol (Spanish given name. The municipality was named after Filipino First Lady Alicia Syquia Quirino.)
 Alicia, Isabela
 Alicia, Zamboanga Sibugay
 Almagro, Samar (named after the Spanish city of Almagro in Castile-La Mancha, Spain.)
 Almeria, Biliran (named after the Spanish city of Almería in Andalusia, Spain.)
 Altavas, Aklan (Spanish surname. The municipality was named after Filipino senator Jose Altavas.)
 Amadeo, Cavite (Spanish given name. The municipality was named after King Amadeo I of Spain)
 Anda, Bohol (Spanish surname. The municipality was named after Spanish Governor-General Simón de Anda y Salazar.)
 Anda, Pangasinan
 Antequera, Bohol (named after the Spanish city of Antequera in Malaga, Spain.)
 Araceli, Palawan (derived from Nuestra Señora de Araceli, Spanish name for "Our Lady of the Altar of the Sky".)
 Arteche, Eastern Samar (Spanish surname. The municipality was named after Filipino politician Pedro Arteche.)
 Asturias, Cebu (named after the Spanish principality of Asturias, Spain.)
 Asuncion, Davao del Norte (derived from Nuestra Señora de la Asunción, Spanish name for "Our Lady of the Assumption")
 Aurora, Isabela (Spanish given name which means "dawn". The municipality was named after Filipino First Lady Aurora Quezon.)
 Aurora, Zamboanga del Sur

B
 Ballesteros, Cagayan (Spanish surname. The municipality was named after Filipino priest Gregorio Ballesteros.)
 Barbaza, Antique (Spanish surname. The municipality was named after Spanish governor Enrique Barbaza.)
 Barcelona, Sorsogon (named after the Spanish city of Barcelona.)
 Barotac Nuevo, Iloilo ("New Barotac")
 Barotac Viejo, Iloilo ("Old Barotac")
 Basco, Batanes (Spanish surname. The municipality was named after Spanish Governor-General José Basco y Vargas.)
 Basilisa, Dinagat Islands (Spanish given name.)
 Basista, Pangasinan (Spanish surname of unknown origin.)
 Bautista, Pangasinan (derived from San Juan Bautista, Spanish name for "Saint John the Baptist")
 Benito Soliven, Isabela (Spanish name. The municipality was named after Filipino politician Benito T. Soliven.)
 Bien Unido, Bohol ("well united")
 Bilar, Bohol (named after the Spanish municipality of Elvillar in Basque Country, Spain.)
 Bonifacio, Misamis Occidental (Spanish surname. The municipality was named after Filipino patriot Andres Bonifacio.)
 Borbon, Cebu (named after Spain's King Philip V of Borbon)
 Braulio E. Dujali, Davao del Norte (Spanish name. The municipality was named after a Filipino pioneer.)
 Buenavista, Agusan del Norte ("good view")
 Buenavista, Bohol
 Buenavista, Guimaras
 Buenavista, Marinduque
 Buenavista, Quezon
 Bugallon, Pangasinan (Spanish surname. The municipality was named after Filipino revolutionary Jose Torres Bugallon.)
 Burdeos, Quezon (named after the French city of Bordeaux by a Spanish friar, which in Spanish is "Burdeos")
 Burgos, Ilocos Norte (named after the Spanish city of Burgos, Castille)
 Burgos, Ilocos Sur
 Burgos, Isabela
 Burgos, La Union
 Burgos, Pangasinan
 Burgos, Surigao del Norte
 Bustos, Bulacan ("tombs")

C
 Cagayancillo, Palawan ("Little Cagayan")
 Calatrava, Negros Occidental (named after the old Spanish town of Calatrava la Vieja in Castile-La Mancha, Spain.)
 Calatrava, Romblon
 Candelaria, Quezon (derived from Nuestra Señora de la Candelaria, Spanish name for "Our Lady of Candlemas")
 Candelaria, Zambales
 Cardona, Rizal (named after the Spanish town of Cardona in Catalonia, Spain.)
 Carles, Iloilo (Spanish/Catalan surname. The municipality was named after Spanish governor Jose Maria Carles.)
 Carmen, Agusan del Norte (derived from Nuestra Señora de Monte Carmelo commonly referred to as Virgen del Carmen, Spanish for "Our Lady of Mount Carmel.")
 Carmen, Bohol
 Carmen, Cebu
 Carmen, Cotabato
 Carmen, Davao del Norte
 Carmen, Surigao del Sur
 Carmona, Cavite (named after the Spanish town of Carmona in Seville, Spain.)
 Carrascal, Surigao del Sur ("oak plantation"/named after Carrascal del Río, a Spanish town.)
 Castilla, Sorsogon (named after the Kingdom of Castile (Spain) )
 Castillejos, Zambales (Spanish surname. The municipality was named after Spanish General Juan Primo y Prata Marques de los Castillejos.)
 Cervantes, Ilocos Sur (named after the Spanish town in Galicia, Spain where Spanish novelist Miguel de Cervantes was born.)
 Clarin, Bohol (Spanish surname. The municipality was named after Filipino politician Aniceto Clarin.)
 Clarin, Misamis Occidental
 Claver, Surigao del Norte (shortened version of the original name San Pedro Claver, Spanish for "Saint Peter Claver", the municipality's patron saint.)
 Claveria, Cagayan (Spanish surname. The municipality was named after Spanish Governor-General Narciso Clavería y Zaldúa.)
 Claveria, Masbate
 Claveria, Misamis Oriental
 Compostela, Cebu (named after the Spanish town of Santiago de Compostela in Galicia, Spain.)	
 Compostela, Davao de Oro
 Concepcion, Iloilo (derived from La Inmaculada Concepcion, Spanish for "Immaculate Conception".)
 Concepcion, Misamis Occidental
 Concepcion, Romblon
 Concepcion, Tarlac
 Consolacion, Cebu (derived from Nuestra Señora de Consolación, Spanish name for "Our Lady of Consolation.")
 Corcuera, Romblon (Spanish surname. The municipality was named after Spanish Governor-General Sebastián Hurtado de Corcuera.)
 Cordoba, Cebu (named after the Spanish city of Córdoba in Andalusia, Spain.)
 Cordon, Isabela ("cord")
 Corella, Bohol (named after the Spanish town of Corella in Navarre, Spain.)
 Cortes, Bohol (Spanish surname. The municipality was named after Spanish conquistador of the Americas Hernán Cortés.)
 Cortes, Surigao del Sur
 Cuartero, Capiz (Spanish surname. The municipality was named after Spanish bishop Mariano Cuartero.)
 Cuenca, Batangas ("river basin")

D

 Del Carmen, Surigao del Norte (contraction of its original name Virgen del Carmen, Spanish for "Virgin of Mount Carmel.")
 Del Gallego, Camarines Sur (Spanish surname. The municipality was named after Spanish-Filipino businessman Juan del Gallego.)
 Delfin Albano, Isabela (Spanish name. The municipality was named after Filipino politician Delfin B. Albano.)
 Dolores, Abra (derived from Nuestra Señora de los Dolores, Spanish name for "Our Lady of Sorrows")
 Dolores, Eastern Samar
 Dolores, Quezon
 Don Carlos, Bukidnon (Spanish name. The municipality was named after Filipino politician Carlos Fortich.)
 Don Marcelino, Davao del Sur (Spanish name. The municipality was named after Filipino pioneer Marcelino Maruya.)
 Don Victoriano Chiongbian, Misamis Occidental (Spanish name. The municipality was named after Filipino-Chinese politician Victoriano Chiongbian.)
 Donsol, Sorsogon (Spanish name. The municipality was named after Don for Mister and Sol for sun.)
 Doña Remedios Trinidad, Bulacan (Spanish name. The municipality was named after Remedios T. Romualdez, mother of Filipino First Lady Imelda Marcos)
 Dueñas, Iloilo (named after the Spanish town of Dueñas in Palencia, Spain.)
 Duero, Bohol (named after "Rio Duero" in the Iberian peninsula.)
 Dupax del Norte, Nueva Vizcaya ("Dupax of the North")
 Dupax del Sur, Nueva Vizcaya ("Dupax of the South")

E

 Echague, Isabela (Spanish surname. The municipality was named after Spanish Governor-General Rafaél de Echagüe y Bermingham.)
 El Nido, Palawan ("The Bird's Nest")
 El Salvador, Misamis Oriental ("The Savior")
 Enrile, Cagayan (Spanish surname. The municipality was named after Spanish Governor-General Pascual Enrile y Alcedo.)
 Enrique B. Magalona, Negros Occidental (Spanish name. The municipality was named after a Filipino politician.)
 Enrique Villanueva, Siquijor (Spanish name. The municipality was named after Filipino politician Enrique C. Villanueva.)
 Escalante, Negros Occidental (named after the Spanish town of Escalante in Cantabria, Spain.)
 Esperanza, Agusan del Sur ("hope" / from Nuestra Señora de la Esperanza, Spanish for "Our Lady of Hope")
 Esperanza, Masbate
 Esperanza, Sultan Kudarat
 Estancia, Iloilo ("ranch")

F
 Famy, Laguna (Spanish surname. The municipality was named after Filipino president Emilio Aguinaldo y Famy.)
 Ferrol, Romblon (named after the city of Ferrol in Galicia, Spain.)
 Flora, Apayao (Spanish given name. The municipality was named after the wife of Filipino congressman Alfredo Lam-en.)
 Floridablanca, Pampanga ("white flower")

G

 Gabaldon, Nueva Ecija (Spanish surname. The municipality was named after Filipino politician Isauro Gabaldon.)
 Gainza, Camarines Sur (Spanish surname. The municipality was named after Spanish bishop Francisco Gainza.)
 Gandara, Samar (Spanish surname. The municipality was named after Spanish Governor-General José de la Gándara y Navarro.)
 Garchitorena, Camarines Sur (Spanish surname. The municipality was named after Spanish-Filipino revolutionary Andres Garchitorena.)
 Garcia Hernandez, Bohol (Spanish surname. The municipality was named after two Spanish missionaries - (Friar Narciso Hernandez de Jesus y Maria, O.A.R., Spanish Parish Priest of Guindulman and Friar Jose Garcia de la Virgen de los Remedios, O.A.R., Filipino Parish Priest of Loon.)
 General Emilio Aguinaldo, Cavite (Spanish name. The municipality was named after Filipino president Emilio Aguinaldo.)
 General Luna, Quezon (Spanish surname. The municipality was named after Filipino patriot General Antonio Luna.)
 General Luna, Surigao del Norte
 General Mamerto Natividad, Nueva Ecija (Spanish name. The municipality was named after a Filipino revolutionary.)
 General Mariano Alvarez, Cavite (Spanish name. The municipality was named after Filipino patriot Mariano Álvarez.)
 General Tinio, Nueva Ecija (Spanish name. The municipality was named after Filipino revolutionary General Manuel Tinio.)
 Gerona, Tarlac (named after the Spanish city of Girona in Catalonia, Spain.)
 Getafe, Bohol (named after the Spanish city of Getafe in Madrid, Spain.)
 Gloria, Oriental Mindoro (Spanish given name. The municipality was named after Filipino president Gloria Arroyo.)
 Gonzaga, Cagayan (Spanish surname. The municipality was named after Filipino politician Gracio Gonzaga.)
 Governor Generoso, Davao Oriental (Spanish surname. The municipality was named after Filipino politician Sebastian Generoso.)
 Gregorio del Pilar, Ilocos Sur (Spanish name. The municipality was named after Filipino patriot Gregorio del Pilar.)

H

 Hermosa, Bataan ("beautiful"/a contraction of its original name Llana Hermosa which means "beautiful plains.")
 Hernani, Eastern Samar (named after the Spanish town of Hernani in Basque Country, Spain.)

I

 Imelda, Zamboanga Sibugay (Spanish given name. The municipality was named after Filipino First Lady Imelda Marcos.)
 Infanta, Pangasinan (named after Princess Infanta Eulalia of Spain.)
 Infanta, Quezon
 Isabel, Leyte (Spanish given name. The municipality was named after Queen Isabella II of Spain.)
 Isabela, Negros Occidental (Spanish given name. The municipality was named after Queen Isabella II of Spain.)

J

 Jaen, Nueva Ecija (named after the Spanish city of Jaén in Andalusia, Spain.)
 Javier, Leyte (Spanish surname. The municipality was named after Filipino teacher and pioneer Daniel Falcon Javier.)
 Jimenez, Misamis Occidental (Spanish surname. The municipality was named after Spanish missionary Francisco Jimenez de Fermin.)
 Jose Abad Santos, Davao del Sur (Spanish name. The municipality was named after the Chief Justice of the Supreme Court of the Philippines (José Abad Santos.)
 Jose Dalman, Zamboanga del Norte (Spanish name. The municipality was named after Filipino patriot Jose Dalman.)
 Josefina, Zamboanga del Sur (Spanish given name. The municipality was named after Josefina Edralin, mother of Filipino president Ferdinand Marcos.)
 Jovellar, Albay (Spanish surname. The municipality was named after Spanish Governor-General Joaquín Jovellar.)
 Julita, Leyte (Spanish given name. The municipality was named after Filipino pioneer Julita Caladcad.)

L

 La Castellana, Negros Occidental (named after Paseo de la Castellana in Madrid, Spain.)
 La Libertad, Negros Oriental ("the freedom")
 La Libertad, Zamboanga del Norte
 La Paz, Abra (derived from Nuestra Señora da la Paz, Spanish name for "Our Lady of Peace.")
 La Paz, Agusan del Sur
 La Paz, Leyte
 La Paz, Tarlac
 La Trinidad, Benguet ("The Trinity")
 Labrador, Pangasinan (contraction of San Isidro Labrador, Spanish name for "Saint Isidore the Laborer")
 Lanuza, Surigao del Sur (Spanish surname of unknown origin.)
 Larena, Siquijor (Spanish surname. The municipality was named after Filipino politician Demetrio Larena.)
 Las Navas, Northern Samar ("the plains")
 Las Nieves, Agusan del Norte ("the snows"; from Nuestra Señora de las Nieves, Spanish for "Our Lady of the Snows.")
 Laurel, Batangas (Spanish surname. The municipality was named after Filipino president José P. Laurel.)
 Lavezares, Northern Samar (Spanish surname. The municipality was named after Spanish Governor-General Guido de Lavezaris.)
 Lazi, Siquijor (derived from the Spanish surname Lacy. The municipality was named after Spanish Governor-General Manuel Pavía y Lacy.)
 Leganes, Iloilo (named after the Spanish city of Leganés in Madrid, Spain.)
 Lemery, Batangas (Spanish surname. The municipality was named after Spanish Governor-General José Lemery e Ibarrola Ney y González.)
 Lemery, Iloilo
 Leon, Iloilo (named after the Spanish city of León in central Spain.)
 Leon B. Postigo, Zamboanga del Norte (Spanish name. The municipality was named after a Filipino general.)
 Lezo, Aklan (named after the Spanish town of Lezo in Basque Country, Spain.)
 Libertad, Antique ("freedom")
 Libertad, Misamis Oriental
 Llanera, Nueva Ecija (Spanish surname. The municipality was named after Filipino revolutionary General Mariano Llanera.)
 Llorente, Eastern Samar (Spanish surname. The municipality was named after Filipino politician Julio Llorente.)
 Lope de Vega, Northern Samar (named after the Spanish poet Lope de Vega.)
 Lopez, Quezon (Spanish surname. The municipality was named after Spanish politician Don Candido Diaz Lopez.)
 Lopez Jaena, Misamis Occidental (Spanish surname. The municipality was named Filipino patriot Graciano López Jaena.)
 Loreto, Agusan del Sur (derived from Nuestra Señora de Loreto, Spanish name for "Our Lady of Laurel.")
 Loreto, Surigao del Norte
 Los Baños, Laguna ("The Baths")
 Luisiana, Laguna (Spanish given name. The municipality was named after Spanish politician Luis Bernardo.)
 Luna, Apayao (Spanish surname. The municipality was named after Filipino painter Juan Luna.)
 Luna, Isabela
 Luna, La Union

M

 Macrohon, Southern Leyte (Spanish surname. The municipality was named after Spanish Governor-General Manuel MacCrohon.)
 Madrid, Surigao del Sur (named after the Spanish capital city of Madrid.)
 Madridejos, Cebu (named after the Spanish town of Madridejos in Castile-La Mancha, Spain.)
 Magallanes, Agusan del Norte (named after Portuguese discoverer Ferdinand Magellan, in Spanish: Fernando de Magallanes.)
 Magallanes, Cavite
 Magallanes, Sorsogon
 Magdalena, Laguna (Spanish given name derived from Santa Maria Magdalena, Spanish for "Saint Mary Magdalene.")
 Malvar, Batangas (Spanish surname. The municipality was named after Filipino patriot General Miguel Malvar.)
 Manolo Fortich, Bukidnon (Spanish name. The municipality was named after a Filipino politician.)
 Marcos, Ilocos Norte (Spanish surname. The municipality was named after Filipino president Ferdinand Marcos.)
 Maria, Siquijor (Spanish given name; contraction of its original name Santa Maria.)
 Maria Aurora, Aurora (Spanish given name. The municipality was named after Filipino presidential daughter Maria Aurora Quezon.)
 Mayorga, Leyte (named after the Spanish island of Mallorca.)
 Medellin, Cebu (named after the Spanish village of Medellín in Badajoz, Spain.)
 Mendez, Cavite (Spanish surname. The municipality was named after Spanish naval officer Casto Méndez Núñez.)
 Mercedes, Camarines Norte (Spanish given name. The municipality was named after Spain's Princess Mercedes of Asturias.)
 Mercedes, Eastern Samar
 Merida, Leyte (named after the Spanish city of Mérida in Extremadura, Spain.)
 Mexico, Pampanga (named after New Spain (Mexico).)
 Milagros, Masbate ("miracles", derived from Milagros de Nuestra Señora, Spanish for "The Miracles of Our Lady.")
 Mina, Iloilo ("mine")
 Minglanilla, Cebu (named after the Spanish town of Minglanilla in Castile-La Mancha, Spain.)
 Moises Padilla, Negros Occidental (Spanish name. The municipality was named after a Filipino politician.)
 Molave, Zamboanga del Sur (from Molave, a Philippine timber tree; in Tagalog, "mulawin")
 Moncada, Tarlac (named after the Spanish municipality of Moncada in Valencia, Spain.)
 Mondragon, Northern Samar (named after the Spanish town of Mondragón in Basque Country, Spain.)
 Monkayo, Davao de Oro (named after Mount Moncayo in Spain.)
 Monreal, Masbate (Spanish surname. The municipality was named after Filipino politician Bernardino G. Monreal.)
 Montevista, Davao de Oro ("mountain view")
 Murcia, Negros Occidental (named after the Spanish city of Murcia.)

N

 Nabas, Aklan (derived from Spanish surname Navas. The municipality was named after Spanish Governor General Cárlos María de la Torre y Nava Cerrada.)
 Natividad, Pangasinan (derived from Natividad de Nuestro Señor Jesucristo, Spanish for "The Nativity of Our Lord Jesus Christ.")
 Naval, Biliran (derived from "La Naval de Manila.")
 New Corella, Davao del Norte (named after the Spanish town of Corella in Navarre, Spain.)
 New Lucena, Iloilo (named after the Spanish town of Lucena in Andalusia, Spain.)
 Norala, South Cotabato (derived from Norte de Alah, Spanish for "North Alah (Valley).")
 Norzagaray, Bulacan (Spanish surname. The municipality was named after Spanish Governor-General Fernándo Norzagaray y Escudero.)
 Nueva Era, Ilocos Norte ("New Era")
 Nueva Valencia, Guimaras ("New Valencia"; named after the Spanish city of Valencia.)
 Numancia, Aklan (named after the Spanish town of Numantia in Castile-La Mancha, Spain.)

O

 Obando, Bulacan (Spanish surname. The municipality was named after Spanish Governor-General Francisco José de Ovando.)
 Ocampo, Camarines Sur (Spanish surname. The municipality was named after Filipino politician Julian Ocampo.)

P

 Padre Burgos, Quezon (Spanish name. The municipality was named after Filipino priest and martyr Father José Burgos.)
 Padre Burgos, Southern Leyte
 Padre Garcia, Batangas (Spanish name. The municipality was named after Filipino priest and patriot Father Vicente Garcia.)
 Palo, Leyte ("stick")
 Pamplona, Cagayan (named after the Spanish city of Pamplona in Navarre, Spain.)
 Pamplona, Camarines Sur
 Pamplona, Negros Oriental
 Pastrana, Leyte (named after the Spanish town of Pastrana in Guadalajara, Spain.)
 Pateros ("duck-raisers")
 Pavia, Iloilo (Spanish surname. The municipality was named after Spanish Governor-General Manuel Pavía y Lacy.)
 Peñablanca, Cagayan ("white rock")
 Peñaranda, Nueva Ecija (Spanish surname. The municipality was named after Spanish engineer José Maria Peñaranda.)
 Peñarrubia, Abra ("red rock")
 Perez, Quezon (Spanish surname. The municipality was named after Filipino politician Filemón E. Perez.)
 Pilar, Abra (derived from Nuestra Señora del Pilar, Spanish name for "Our Lady of the Pillar.")
 Pilar, Bataan
 Pilar, Bohol
 Pilar, Capiz
 Pilar, Cebu
 Pilar, Sorsogon
 Pilar, Surigao del Norte
 Pililla, Rizal ("Little Pila")
 Piñan, Zamboanga del Norte (derived from piña, Spanish for "pineapple.")
 Pio V. Corpuz, Masbate (Spanish name. The municipality was named after a Filipino politician.)
 Pio Duran, Albay (Spanish name. The municipality was named after Filipino politician Pio S. Duran.)
 Placer, Masbate ("sandbank")
 Placer, Surigao del Norte
 Plaridel, Bulacan (Spanish surname. The municipality was named after Filipino patriot Marcelo H. Del Pilar, whose pen name was Plaridel.)
 Plaridel, Misamis Occidental
 Plaridel, Quezon
 Polanco, Zamboanga del Norte (Spanish surname. The municipality was named after Spanish missionary Father Juan Polanco.)
 Pontevedra, Capiz (named after the Spanish city of Pontevedra in Galicia, Spain.)
 Pontevedra, Negros Occidental
 Pozorrubio, Pangasinan ("red well")
 Presentacion, Camarines Sur (Spanish surname. The municipality was named after Filipino politician Teodorico Presentacion.)
 President Carlos P. Garcia, Bohol (Spanish name. The municipality was named after Filipino President Carlos P. Garcia.)
 President Manuel Roxas, Zamboanga del Norte (Spanish name. The municipality was named after Filipino president Manuel Roxas)
 President Quirino, Sultan Kudarat (Spanish surname. The municipality was named after Filipino President Elpidio Quirino.)
 President Roxas, Capiz (Spanish surname. The municipality was named after Filipino President Manuel Roxas.)
 President Roxas, Cotabato
 Prieto Diaz, Sorsogon (Spanish surnames. The municipality was named after Filipino politicians, Gabriel Prieto and Severino Díaz.)
 Prosperidad, Agusan del Sur ("prosperity")
 Puerto Galera, Oriental Mindoro ("Port of the Galleys")
 Pura, Tarlac (derived from pura raza ilocana, Spanish for "pure ilocano race" in reference to its early settlers.)

Q

 Quezon, Bukidnon (Spanish surname. The municipality was named after Filipino president Manuel Luis Quezon.)
 Quezon, Isabela
 Quezon, Nueva Ecija
 Quezon, Nueva Vizcaya
 Quezon, Palawan
 Quezon, Quezon
 Quirino, Ilocos Sur (Spanish surname. The municipality was named after Filipino president Elpidio Quirino.)
 Quirino, Isabela

R
 Ramon, Isabela (Spanish given name. The municipality was named after Filipino president Ramon Magsaysay.)
 Ramon Magsaysay, Zamboanga del Sur
 Ramos, Tarlac (Spanish surname. The municipality was named after Filipino politician Alfonso Ramos.)
 Real, Quezon (contraction of its original name Puerto Real, Spanish for "Royal Port.")
 Reina Mercedes, Isabela ("Queen Mercedes"; The municipality was named after Queen Mercedes of Spain.)
 Remedios T. Romualdez, Agusan del Norte (Spanish name. The municipality was named after Remedios T. Romualdez, mother of Filipino First Lady Imelda Marcos.)
 Rizal, Cagayan (Spanish surname. The municipality was named after Filipino patriot José Rizal.)
 Rizal, Kalinga
 Rizal, Laguna
 Rizal, Nueva Ecija
 Rizal, Occidental Mindoro
 Rizal, Palawan
 Rizal, Zamboanga del Norte
 Rodriguez, Rizal (Spanish surname. The municipality was named after Filipino politician Eulogio Rodriguez. Its former name is Montalban, from the Spanish town of Montalbán in Aragon, Spain.)
 Ronda, Cebu (named after the Spanish city of Ronda in Malaga, Spain.)
 Rosales, Pangasinan (Spanish surname. The municipality was named after Spanish member of the Real Audiencia Antonio Rosales.)
 Rosario, Agusan del Sur ("rosary" / from Nuestra Señora del Rosario, Spanish for "Our Lady of the Rosary.")
 Rosario, Batangas
 Rosario, Cavite
 Rosario, La Union
 Rosario, Northern Samar
 Roseller Lim, Zamboanga Sibugay (Spanish name. The municipality was named after a Filipino-Chinese politician.)
 Roxas, Isabela (Spanish surname. The municipality was named after Filipino president Manuel Roxas.)
 Roxas, Oriental Mindoro
 Roxas, Palawan

S

 Salcedo, Eastern Samar (Spanish surname. The municipality was named after Spanish conquistador Juan de Salcedo.)
 Salcedo, Ilocos Sur
 Salvador, Lanao del Norte (Spanish given name which means "savior." The municipality was named after Filipino politician Salvador T. Lluch.)
 Salvador Benedicto, Negros Occidental (Spanish name. The municipality was named after a Filipino politician.)
 San Agustin, Isabela ("Saint Augustine of Hippo")
 San Agustin, Romblon
 San Agustin, Surigao del Sur
 San Andres, Catanduanes ("Saint Andrew")
 San Andres, Quezon
 San Andres, Romblon
 San Antonio, Northern Samar ("Saint Anthony of Padua")
 San Antonio, Nueva Ecija
 San Antonio, Quezon
 San Antonio, Zambales
 San Benito, Surigao del Norte (derived from San Benedicto, Spanish for "Saint Benedict". San Benito is a diminutive form of San Benedicto.)
 San Clemente, Tarlac ("Saint Clement")
 San Dionisio, Iloilo ("Saint Dionysius")
 San Emilio, Ilocos Sur ("Saint Emilius")
 San Enrique, Iloilo ("Saint Henry")
 San Enrique, Negros Occidental
 San Esteban, Ilocos Sur ("Saint Stephen")
 San Fabian, Pangasinan ("Saint Fabian")
 San Felipe, Zambales ("Saint Philip")
 San Fernando, Bukidnon ("Saint Ferdinand")
 San Fernando, Camarines Sur
 San Fernando, Cebu
 San Fernando, Masbate
 San Fernando, Romblon
 San Francisco, Agusan del Sur ("Saint Francis of Assisi")
 San Francisco, Cebu
 San Francisco, Quezon
 San Francisco, Southern Leyte
 San Francisco, Surigao del Norte
 San Gabriel, La Union ("Saint Gabriel")
 San Guillermo, Isabela ("Saint William the Great")
 San Ildefonso, Bulacan ("Saint Ildephonsus of Toledo")
 San Ildefonso, Ilocos Sur
 San Isidro, Abra ("Saint Isidore the Laborer")
 San Isidro, Bohol
 San Isidro, Davao del Norte
 San Isidro, Davao Oriental
 San Isidro, Isabela
 San Isidro, Leyte
 San Isidro, Northern Samar
 San Isidro, Nueva Ecija
 San Isidro, Surigao del Norte
 San Jacinto, Masbate ("Saint Hyacinth")
 San Jacinto, Pangasinan
 San Joaquin, Iloilo ("Saint Joachim")
 San Jorge, Samar ("Saint George")
 San Jose, Batangas ("Saint Joseph")
 San Jose, Camarines Sur
 San Jose, Dinagat Islands
 San Jose, Negros Oriental
 San Jose, Northern Samar
 San Jose, Occidental Mindoro
 San Jose, Romblon
 San Jose, Tarlac
 San Jose de Buan, Samar ("Saint Joseph of Buan")
 San Jose de Buenavista, Antique ("Saint Joseph of Buenavista")
 San Juan, Abra ("Saint John the Baptist")
 San Juan, Batangas
 San Juan, Ilocos Sur
 San Juan, La Union
 San Juan, Siquijor
 San Juan, Southern Leyte
 San Julian, Eastern Samar	("Saint Julian of Cuenca")
 San Leonardo, Nueva Ecija ("Saint Leonard of Port Maurice")
 San Lorenzo, Guimaras ("Saint Lawrence")
 San Lorenzo Ruiz, Camarines Norte (Spanish name. The municipality was named after the first Filipino saint, Lorenzo Ruiz.)
 San Luis, Agusan del Sur ("Saint Louis of Toulouse")
 San Luis, Aurora
 San Luis, Batangas
 San Luis, Pampanga
 San Manuel, Isabela ("Saint Emmanuel")
 San Manuel, Pangasinan
 San Manuel, Tarlac
 San Marcelino, Zambales ("Saint Marcellinus")
 San Mariano, Isabela ("Saint Marian")
 San Mateo, Isabela ("Saint Matthew")
 San Mateo, Rizal
 San Miguel, Bohol ("Saint Michael")
 San Miguel, Bulacan
 San Miguel, Catanduanes
 San Miguel, Iloilo
 San Miguel, Leyte
 San Miguel, Surigao del Sur
 San Miguel, Zamboanga del Sur
 San Narciso, Quezon ("Saint Narcissus")
 San Narciso, Zambales
 San Nicolas, Batangas ("Saint Nicholas")
 San Nicolas, Ilocos Norte
 San Nicolas, Pangasinan
 San Pablo, Isabela ("Saint Paul the Apostle")
 San Pablo, Zamboanga del Sur
 San Pascual, Batangas ("Saint Paschal Baylon")
 San Pascual, Masbate
 San Pedro, Laguna ("Saint Peter")
 San Policarpo, Eastern Samar ("Saint Polycarp")
 San Quintin, Abra ("Saint Quentin")
 San Quintin, Pangasinan
 San Rafael, Bulacan ("Saint Raphael")
 San Rafael, Iloilo
 San Remigio, Antique ("Saint Remy")
 San Remigio, Cebu
 San Ricardo, Southern Leyte ("Saint Richard")
 San Roque, Northern Samar ("Saint Roch")
 San Sebastian, Samar ("Saint Sebastian")
 San Simon, Pampanga ("Saint Simon the Apostle")
 San Teodoro, Oriental Mindoro ("Saint Theodore")
 San Vicente, Camarines Norte ("Saint Vincent Ferrer")
 San Vicente, Ilocos Sur
 San Vicente, Northern Samar
 San Vicente, Palawan
 Sanchez-Mira, Cagayan (Spanish surname. The municipality was named after Spanish brigadier general Manuel Sanchez Mira.)
 Santa, Ilocos Sur ("Holy")
 Santa Ana, Cagayan ("Saint Anne")
 Santa Ana, Pampanga
 Santa Barbara, Iloilo ("Saint Barbara")
 Santa Barbara, Pangasinan
 Santa Catalina, Ilocos Sur ("Saint Catherine of Alexandria")
 Santa Catalina, Negros Oriental
 Santa Cruz, Davao del Sur ("Holy Cross")
 Santa Cruz, Ilocos Sur
 Santa Cruz, Laguna
 Santa Cruz, Marinduque
 Santa Cruz, Occidental Mindoro
 Santa Cruz, Zambales
 Santa Elena, Camarines Norte ("Saint Helena")
 Santa Fe, Cebu ("Holy Faith")
 Santa Fe, Leyte
 Santa Fe, Nueva Vizcaya
 Santa Fe, Romblon
 Santa Ignacia, Tarlac (Spanish name. The municipality was named after Filipino venerable Mother "Ignacia del Espíritu Santo")
 Santa Josefa, Agusan del Sur (derived from Santa Maria Josefa del Corazon de Jesus, Spanish for "Saint Mary Joseph of the Heart of Jesus.")
 Santa Lucia, Ilocos Sur ("Saint Lucy")
 Santa Magdalena, Sorsogon (derived from Santa Maria Magdalena, Spanish name for "Saint Mary Magdalene.)
 Santa Marcela, Apayao ("Saint Marcella")
 Santa Margarita, Samar ("Saint Margaret")
 Santa Maria, Bulacan ("Saint Mary")
 Santa Maria, Davao del Sur
 Santa Maria, Ilocos Sur
 Santa Maria, Isabela
 Santa Maria, Laguna
 Santa Maria, Pangasinan
 Santa Maria, Romblon
 Santa Monica, Surigao del Norte ("Saint Monica")
 Santa Praxedes, Cagayan ("Saint Praxedes")
 Santa Rita, Pampanga ("Saint Rita of Cascia")
 Santa Rita, Samar
 Santa Rosa, Laguna ("Saint Rose of Lima")
 Santa Rosa, Nueva Ecija
 Santa Teresita, Batangas ("Saint Therese of the Child Jesus")
 Santa Teresita, Cagayan
 Santander, Cebu (named after the Spanish city of Santander in Cantabria, Spain.)
 Santiago, Agusan del Norte ("Saint James the Great")
 Santiago, Ilocos Sur
 Santo Domingo, Albay ("Saint Dominic")
 Santo Domingo, Ilocos Sur
 Santo Domingo, Nueva Ecija
 Santo Niño, Cagayan ("Holy Child")
 Santo Niño, Samar
 Santo Niño, South Cotabato
 Santo Tomas, Batangas ("Saint Thomas Aquinas")
 Santo Tomas, Davao del Norte
 Santo Tomas, Isabela
 Santo Tomas, La Union
 Santo Tomas, Pampanga ("Saint Thomas the Apostle")
 Santo Tomas, Pangasinan
 Sebaste, Antique (Spanish/Latin, biblical place.)
 Senator Ninoy Aquino, Sultan Kudarat (Spanish name. The municipality was named after Filipino senator Benigno Aquino Jr.)
 Sergio Osmeña Sr., Zamboanga del Norte (Spanish name. The municipality was named after Filipino president Sergio Osmeña.)
 Sevilla, Bohol (named after the Spanish city of Seville.)
 Sierra Bullones, Bohol ("foggy mountains")
 Silvino Lobos, Northern Samar (Spanish name. The municipality was named after Filipino local leader Silvino Lobos.)
 Socorro, Oriental Mindoro (derived from Nuestra Señora del Perpetuo Socorro, Spanish name for "Our Lady of Perpetual Help.")
 Socorro, Surigao del Norte
 Sofronio Española, Palawan (Spanish name. The municipality was named after a Filipino politician.)
 Solana, Cagayan (named after the Spanish municipality of La Solana in Castile-La Mancha, Spain.)
 Solano, Nueva Vizcaya (Spanish surname. The municipality was named after Spanish Governor-General Ramón María Solano y Llanderal.)
 Solsona, Ilocos Norte (named after the Spanish town of Solsona in Catalonia, Spain.)
 Surallah, South Cotabato (derived from Sur de Alah, Spanish for "South Alah (Valley).")

T

 Talavera, Nueva Ecija (derived from Talavera de la Reina from a place in Spain.)
 Tarragona, Davao Oriental (named after the Spanish city of Tarragona in Catalonia, Spain.)
 Teresa, Rizal (Spanish given name. The municipality was named after Spanish politician Teresa Rodriguez Candelaria.)
 Tobias Fornier, Antique (Spanish name. The municipality was named after a Filipino politician.)
 Toboso, Negros Occidental (named after the Spanish town of El Toboso in Toledo, Spain.)
 Tolosa, Leyte (named after the Spanish town of Tolosa in Basque Country, Spain.)
 Tomas Oppus, Southern Leyte (Spanish name. The municipality was named after Filipino politician Tomas G. Oppus.)
 Torrijos, Marinduque (named after the Spanish town of Torrijos in Toledo, Spain)
 Trento, Agusan del Sur (Spanish/Italian, named after the Italian holy city of "Trento.")
 Trinidad, Bohol (Spanish given name which means "trinity". The municipality was named after Filipino First Lady Trinidad Roxas.)
 Tudela, Cebu (named after the Spanish town of Tudela in Navarre, Spain.)
 Tudela, Misamis Occidental
 Tuy, Batangas (named after the Spanish town of Tuy in Galicia, Spain.)

U

 Urbiztondo, Pangasinan (Spanish surname. The municipality was named after Spanish Governor-General Antonio de Urbistondo y Eguía.)

V

 Valderrama, Antique (Spanish surname. The municipality was named after Spanish Governor-General Manuel Blanco Valderrama.)
 Valencia, Bohol (named after the Spanish city of Valencia.)
 Valencia, Negros Oriental
 Valladolid, Negros Occidental (named after the Spanish city of Valladolid in Castile and León, Spain.)
 Vallehermoso, Negros Oriental ("beautiful valley")
 Veruela, Agusan del Sur (derived from Santa María de Veruela, Spanish for "Saint Mary of Veruela.")
 Victoria, Laguna ("victory"/named after Filipino presidential daughter Victoria Quirino-Delgado.)
 Victoria, Northern Samar
 Victoria, Oriental Mindoro
 Victoria, Tarlac
 Villaba, Leyte (derived from the Spanish town of Villalba.)
 Villanueva, Misamis Oriental (Spanish surname. The municipality was named after a Mexican-American military captain.)
 Villareal, Samar ("royal village")
 Villasis, Pangasinan (derived from Villacis. The municipality was named after Spanish Governor-General Rafael Maria Aguilar y Fernandez de Santillan Miño y Villacis.)
 Villaverde, Nueva Vizcaya ("green village"/named after Spanish missionary Juan Villaverde.)
 Villaviciosa, Abra (named after the Spanish town of Villaviciosa in Asturias, Spain which means "fertile village.")
 Vincenzo A. Sagun, Zamboanga del Sur (Spanish name. The municipality was named after a Filipino politician.)
 Vinzons, Camarines Norte (Spanish surname. The municipality was named after Filipino politician Wenceslao Vinzons.)

Z

 Zamboanguita, Negros Oriental ("Little Zamboanga")
 Zaragoza, Nueva Ecija (named after the Spanish city of Zaragoza.)
 Zarraga, Iloilo (Spanish surname. The municipality was named after Spanish politician Eugenio Pedro Zarraga.)
 Zumarraga, Samar (named after the Spanish town of Zumarraga in Basque Country, Spain.)

Region

 Cordillera Administrative Region

Barrios and districts

This is not an exhaustive list.

 Arevalo
 Buena Suerte
 California
 Ciudad Real
 Egaña
 Fabrica
 Galicia
 Intramuros
 Los Angeles
 Milagrosa
 Palo Alto
 Pariancillo Villa
 Peñafrancia
 Poblacion
 Ramirez (son of Ramiro, King of Aragon), a barangay of Magallanes 
 Rio Tuba
 San Buenaventura
 Santa Mesa
 Suarez
 Veinte Reales
 Villarica

Islands

This is not an exhaustive list.

 Bajo de Masinloc ("Masinloc Shoal")
 Bantoncillo Island (bantoncillo means "little Banton")
 Bucas Grande ("Big Bucas")
 Caballo Island ("Horse" island)
 Camotes Islands (camotes means sweet potatoes.)
 Carabao Island ("Water Buffalo" island)
 Carlota Island
 Carnaza Island (carnaza means "bait")
 Corregidor Island (literally, island of "correction")
 Cuatro Islas ("Four Islands")
 Dos Hermanos Islands ("Two Brothers" islands)
 El Fraile Island ("The Friar" island)
 Great Santa Cruz Island (Anglicized from Isla Grande de Santa Cruz)
 Isabel Island
 Isla de Convalecencia (literally, island of "convalescence")
 Islas de Gigantes ("Islands of Giants")
 La Monja Island ("The Nun" island)
 Little Santa Cruz Island (Anglicized from Isla Chica de Santa Cruz)
 Maestro de Campo Island ("Field Commander" island)
 Malapascua Island ("Bad Christmas")
 Negros (Spanish for "blacks," referring to the dark-skinned Negritos that inhabited the island.) (the name applies to the entire island (Negros Oriental and Negros Occidental))
 Pan de Azucar Island  ("sugar loaf")
 Pescador Island ("Fisherman" island)
 San Miguel Island
 Santiago Island
 Tablas Island ("Flanks")
 Verde Island ("Green" island)

Mountains and hills

This is not an exhaustive list.

 Caraballo Mountains
 Cordillera Central
 Corregidor Caldera
 Cuernos de Negros
 Laguna Caldera
 Mount Halcon
 Mount Mirador
 Mount Santa Rita
 Mount Santo Tomas
 Mount Sembrano
 Sierra Madre

Streets and roads

This is not an exhaustive list.

 Acacia Highway
 Antero Soriano Highway
 Ayala Avenue
 Colon Street
 Doña Soledad Avenue
 Epifanio de los Santos Avenue
 Escolta Street
 España Boulevard
 Gregorio Araneta Avenue
 Julia Vargas Avenue
 Maria Clara L. Lobregat Highway
 Mendiola Street
 Ortigas Avenue
 Osmeña Boulevard
 Padre Burgos Avenue
 Paseo de Roxas
 Zobel Roxas Street

Rivers

This is not an exhaustive list.

 Abra River
 Chico River
 Marikina River
 Muleta River
 Puerto Princesa Subterranean River
 Rio Grande de Cagayan
 Rio Grande de Mindanao
 Rio Grande de Pampanga
 San Cristobal River
 San Juan River
 Santa Cruz River

Bays and inlets

 Cañacao Bay
 Honda Bay (Anglicized from Bahia Honda, lit. "deep bay")
 Illana Bay
 Isla Verde Passage
 Magellan Bay
 Moro Gulf
 San Bernardino Strait
 San Juanico Strait
 San Miguel Bay
 San Pedro Bay
 Tañon Strait

Lakes

 La Mesa Lake
 Laguna de Bay
 Lake Venado
 San Roque Lake

See also
 Spanish influence on Filipino culture
 List of Philippine provincial name etymologies
 List of Philippine city name etymologies
 List of Philippine place names of English origin

References

Spanish
History of the Philippines (1565–1898)
Spanish language in the Philippines